The Royal Naval College of Canada (RNCC) was established by the Department of the Naval Service after the formation of the Royal Canadian Navy (RCN) in 1910. The college was placed under the auspices of the Minister of Naval Service (and of Marine and Fisheries) and controlled by the Director of the Naval Service, Rear-Admiral Charles Kingsmill. The initial goal was to train a new generation of Canadian naval officers for the RCN. The college existed from 1911 to 1922 and educated about 150 students until it was closed due to declining numbers and budget cuts by the government of Canada. As the RCN did not have large ships of its own other than HMCS Niobe and HMCS Rainbow, the cadets followed a course of study that would qualify them for eventual service on British warships. The graduated midshipmen were required to serve approximately one year of "big ship duty" as part of their training.

The college was housed in a refurbished three storey brick building, the former naval hospital, at the north end of HMC Dockyard. The structure was built in 1863 to replace the original hospital destroyed in an 1815 fire. However, the building was heavily damaged in the 1917 Halifax Explosion. In the Spring of 1918, the college was temporarily moved to facilities at the Royal Military College (RMC) in Kingston, Ontario. In September, the college was relocated to the naval dockyard at Esquimalt, British Columbia. The college was closed in 1922 after a parliamentary decision.

History

The King’s permission was obtained to add the prefix 'Royal' to the title of the Naval College of Canada in October 1910, with the abbreviation being 'R.N.C.C.' The naval college was established at Halifax, Nova Scotia in 1911. RNCC was co-commanded by Lieutenant Commander Edward Atcherley Eckersall Nixon, RN (1878–1924) and Officer-In-Charge, Commander Edward Harrington Martin (1859–1921), with the assistance of the Director of Studies. Martin was also the Senior Captain-In-Charge of HMC Dockyard and spent very little time at the college. For all intents, Nixon or "Nix", as he was affectionately referred to by the students and staff, was the ever-present person of authority and inspiration throughout the college's history. In 1915, the staff included a commander, an instructor commander, an engineer commander, two instructor lieutenant commanders, a paymaster lieutenant commander, a lieutenant, an engineer lieutenant, three civilian masters, a chief boatswain, a boatswain and a warrant writer.

The college facilities at Halifax consisted of workshops, drawing office, gymnasium, sick quarters, boathouse and a playing field. After the 1917 Halifax Explosion, the students were sent home for Christmas until arrangements could be made to move the college. This ship was also damaged in the explosion. Classes reconvened in the Spring of 1918.

In September 1918 the RNCC was moved to a building in the Royal Canadian Navy dockyard at Esquimalt. Classes were also held on the Dominion Government Ship Naden, commissioned as a tender for training in sail.
The College was closed in 1922.  In the years between 1922 and 1940, Canadian naval cadets went to the Royal Navy's Royal Naval College in Portsmouth.

Program
The Royal Naval College of Canada was established to impart a complete education in Naval Science. Candidates were British subjects between 14 and 16 years of age. The terms and curriculum approximated those of Naval Colleges in Britain save for the initial two year rather than three-year program which was followed by a training year in a H.M. cruiser.  Initially a Naval career was compulsory. Once the obligation for cadets to follow a naval career was removed, the program was lengthened to three years beginning with the August term of 1914 (Fifth Term). Arrangements were made with certain universities and with the Admiralty to receive cadets. The course provided a grounding in Applied Science, Engineering, Mathematics, Navigation, History and Modern Languages and was accepted as qualifying for entry as second-year students in Canadian universities. The program aimed to develop physical and mental abilities, including discipline, the ability to obey and take charge, and honour. Candidates had to be between their fourteenth and sixteenth birthdays on 1 July following the examination.

Graduates were qualified to enter the Imperial or Canadian Service as midshipmen.

Notable historical milestones

Facilities

Commandants

Notable alumni
Notable alumni of the college are shown below.

59005-033 A brass plaque at St. Paul's Anglican Church in Esquimalt, BC, is dedicated to the four ex-cadets of the Royal Naval College of Canada and men of Her Majesty's Ship (HMS) Good Hope who were killed in action in 1914 as well as Lieutenant W.M. Maitland-Dougall killed in 1918.
Four cadets of the first class of the Royal Navy College of Canada (1911–14), were the First Canadian Navy casualties in the First World War. Midshipman Malcolm Cann (RCNC 1911–14), Midshipman John V.W. Hatheway (RCNC 1911–14), Midshipman William Archibald Palmer (RCNC 1911–14), and Midshipman Arthur Wiltshire Silver (RCNC 1911-14), died when the British warship  went down with no survivors, sunk by the German navy on 1 November 1914.

An inquiry later found that Lieutenant (RCN) William McKinstry Heriot-Maitland-Dougall (1911–1914) had acted in the only manner possible to him. HMS D3 was sunk in error by French dirigible AT-9, which could not see D3's insignia because of the sub’s reflection off the waves, and took her to be a U-boat firing upon it. The French hadn't been informed that D3 was assigned to their waters in the English Channel and were not aware that British submarines were identifying themselves with rockets as opposed to flashing lights.

See also
 Royal Military College Saint-Jean
 The Canadian Crown and the Canadian Armed Forces
 Royal Naval Canadian Volunteer Reserve
 Canadian Military Colleges

References

 Two Naval Colleges in Canada? Setting the Royal Roads record straight Retrieved: 2010-08-06
 National Defence and the Canadian Forces - The Maple Leaf - The Royal Naval College of Canada Closes Retrieved: 2010-08-06

External links

Educational institutions established in 1911
Naval academies
Defunct Canadian military colleges
Organizations based in Canada with royal patronage
Royal Canadian Navy
Naval history of Canada
Military units and formations established in 1911
Military units and formations disestablished in 1922
1911 establishments in Nova Scotia